The rivalry between Thai boxers in the world champion title. It's been 18 times until now (2022).

References

Boxing in Thailand
Boxing matches
 Boxing rivalries
Boxers rivalry